The 1927 Campeonato de Portugal Final was the final match of the 1926–27 Campeonato de Portugal, the 6th season of the Campeonato de Portugal, the Portuguese football knockout tournament, organized by the Portuguese Football Federation (FPF). The match was played on 12 June 1927 at the Estádio do Lumiar in Lisbon, and opposed Belenenses and Vitória de Setúbal. Belenenses defeated Vitória de Setúbal 3–0 to claim their first Campeonato de Portugal.

Match

Details

References

1927
1927 in association football
C.F. Os Belenenses matches
Vitória F.C. matches
1926–27 in Portuguese football